Eucalyptus mediocris, commonly known as inland white mahogany, is a eucalypt that is endemic to the Australian state of Queensland.

Description
It has fibrous, rough grey or yellowish grey-brown or orange-brown-grey coloured bark throughout. It is attached to the trunk in flat strips resembling a typical stringybark.

The concolorous glossy green adult leaves are alternately arranged. It flowers between July and October producing axillary unbranched inflorescences but can appear to be arranged in clusters toward the end of the branch.

The disc is almost level and has three or four valves.

Taxonomy
The species was first formally described by the botanists Lawrence Alexander Sidney Johnson and Ken Hill in 1992 as part of the work "A taxonomic revision of the White Mahogonies, Eucalyptus series Acmenoideae (Myrtaceae)" as published in the journal Telopea.

The specific epithet is taken from the Latin word mediocris meaning "middling" in reference to medium-sized habit of the tree.

E. mediocris is part of the white mahogany group as recognised by Ken Hill, others in the group include; E. acmenoides, E. apothalassica, E. carnea, E. helidonica, E. latisinensis, E. psammitica and E. umbra.

The type specimen was collected by Ken Hill just north of Glenhaughton in 1996.

Distribution
The tree is native to an area of inland Queensland from around the Carnarvon Range in the north east extending south to the Atherton Tableland.

See also
List of Eucalyptus species

References

Trees of Australia
mediocris
Myrtales of Australia
Flora of Queensland
Plants described in 1992